West Bedford is an unincorporated community in Bedford Township, Coshocton County, Ohio, United States.

History
West Bedford was laid out in 1817. The community's name is derived from Bedford County, Pennsylvania, the native home of Doreen Peterson Kinninger, an early settler. A post office was established at West Bedford in 1819, and remained in operation until 1955.

References

Populated places in Coshocton County, Ohio
1817 establishments in Ohio
Populated places established in 1817